Bellevue is a historic plantation house located near Morganton, Burke County, North Carolina.  It was built about 1826, and consists of a two-story, six bay brick structure, with an original one-story wing, in the Federal style.  It has a Quaker plan interior.

It was listed on the National Register of Historic Places in 1973.

References

Plantation houses in North Carolina
Houses on the National Register of Historic Places in North Carolina
Federal architecture in North Carolina
Houses completed in 1826
Houses in Burke County, North Carolina
National Register of Historic Places in Burke County, North Carolina
1826 establishments in North Carolina